Küstülü   (former Yanıkköy) is a village in Erdemli district of Mersin Province, Turkey. The population of the village was 570  as of 2012. There are traces of ancient civilizations around the village (See Üçayaklı ruins) But the village was founded in 1790 by a Turkmen tribe named Elbeyli. Küstüllü ise a dispersed settlement due to shortage of irrigation water. Main economic activity is farming. Tomato cucumber and bean among the main crops   Fruits like plum, peach and apple are also produced.

References

Villages in Erdemli District